Gennady Krysin (born 25 December 1957 in Moscow) is a Russian former gymnast who competed in the 1976 Summer Olympics.

References

1957 births
Living people
Russian male artistic gymnasts
Olympic gymnasts of the Soviet Union
Gymnasts at the 1976 Summer Olympics
Olympic silver medalists for the Soviet Union
Olympic medalists in gymnastics
Soviet male artistic gymnasts
Medalists at the World Artistic Gymnastics Championships
Medalists at the 1976 Summer Olympics
20th-century Russian people
21st-century Russian people